Nurse Jackie, an American medical comedy-drama series created by Evan Dunsky, Liz Brixius, and Linda Wallem, premiered on Showtime on June 8, 2009. The series stars Edie Falco as title character Jackie Peyton, a nurse addicted to painkillers while working in the emergency ward at All Saints' Hospital in New York City. The series concluded on June 28, 2015, after 80 episodes over seven seasons.

Series overview

Episodes

Season 1 (2009)

Season 2 (2010)

Season 3 (2011)

Season 4 (2012)

Season 5 (2013)

Season 6 (2014)

Season 7 (2015)

References

External links 
 
 

Lists of American comedy-drama television series episodes